A power system consists of a number of synchronous machines operating synchronously under all operating conditions. Under normal operating conditions, the relative position of the rotor axis and the resultant magnetic field axis is fixed. The angle between the two is known as the power angle or torque angle. During any disturbance, the rotor decelerates or accelerates with respect to the synchronously rotating air gap magnetomotive force, creating relative motion. The equation describing the relative motion is known as the swing equation, which is a non-linear second order differential equation that describes the swing of the rotor of synchronous machine. The power exchange between the mechanical rotor and the electrical grid due to the rotor swing (acceleration and deceleration) is called Inertial response.

Derivation

A synchronous generator is driven by a prime mover. The equation governing the rotor motion is given by:

 N-m

Where:

 is the total moment of inertia of the rotor mass in kg-m2
 is the angular position of the rotor with respect to a stationary axis in (rad)
 is time in seconds (s)
 is the mechanical torque supplied by the prime mover in N-m
 is the electrical torque output of the alternator in N-m
 is the net accelerating torque, in N-m

Neglecting losses, the difference between the mechanical and electrical torque gives the net accelerating torque Ta. In the steady state, the electrical torque is equal to the mechanical torque and hence the accelerating power is zero. During this period the rotor moves at synchronous speed ωs in rad/s. The electric torque Te corresponds to the net air-gap power in the machine and thus accounts for the total output power of the generator plus I2R losses in the armature winding.

The angular position θ is measured with a stationary reference frame. Representing it with respect to the synchronously rotating frame gives:

where, δm is the angular position in rad with respect to the synchronously rotating reference frame. The derivative of the above equation with respect to time is:

The above equations show that the rotor angular speed is equal to the synchronous speed only when dδm/dt is equal to zero. Therefore, the term dδm/dt represents the deviation of the rotor speed from synchronism in rad/s.

By taking the second order derivative of the above equation it becomes:

Substituting the above equation in the equation of rotor motion gives:

 N-m

Introducing the angular velocity ωm of the rotor for the notational purpose,  and multiplying both sides by ωm,

 W

where, Pm , Pe and Pa respectively are the mechanical, electrical and accelerating power in MW.

The coefficient Jωm is the angular momentum of the rotor: at synchronous speed ωs, it is denoted by M and called the inertia constant of the machine. Normalizing it as

  MJ/MVA

where Srated is the three phase rating of the machine in MVA. Substituting in the above equation

.

In steady state, the machine angular speed is equal to the synchronous speed and hence ωm can be replaced in the above equation by ωs. Since P, P and P are given in MW, dividing them by the generator MVA rating Srated gives these quantities in per unit. Dividing the above equation on both sides by Srated gives

The above equation describes the behaviour of the rotor dynamics and hence is known as the swing equation. The angle δ is the angle of the internal EMF of the generator and it dictates the amount of power that can be transferred. This angle is therefore called the load angle.

References

Equations
Electric power transmission systems